Gharji may refer to:

Gharji, Badakhshan, Afghanistan
Gharji, Faryab, Afghanistan